Tiago Fontoura da Fonseca Morais (born 3 September 2003) is a Portuguese professional footballer who plays as a forward for Leixões on loan from Boavista.

Playing career
Morais made his professional debut with Boavista in a 4-1 Primeira Liga loss to S.C. Braga on 28 December 2020. At 17 years and 3 months old, Morais is the youngest debutant for Boavista in the Primeira Liga.

References

External links
 
 
 

2003 births
People from Espinho, Portugal
Sportspeople from Aveiro District
Living people
Portuguese footballers
Association football forwards
Boavista F.C. players
Leixões S.C. players
Primeira Liga players
Liga Portugal 2 players